River Machno is a river in Snowdonia in north-west Wales. It is the first major tributary of the River Conwy, which it joins south of Betws-y-coed, past the Pandy Falls and the Machno Falls.

It has its source in the slopes at the head of the Machno valley, and flows through the villages of Cwm Penmachno and Penmachno.

Bro Machno
Machno
Machno